Simo Važić (22 August 1934 – 25 February 2019) was a Yugoslav middle-distance runner. He competed in the men's 1500 metres at the 1964 Summer Olympics.

References

External links
 

1934 births
2019 deaths
People from Tomislavgrad
Athletes (track and field) at the 1964 Summer Olympics
Yugoslav male middle-distance runners
Yugoslav male long-distance runners
Olympic athletes of Yugoslavia